The 1968 Lehigh Engineers football team was an American football team that represented Lehigh University during the 1968 NCAA College Division football season. Lehigh tied for second in the Middle Atlantic Conference, University Division, and placed second in the Middle Three Conference.

In their fourth year under head coach Fred Dunlap, the Engineers compiled a 3–7 record. Rick Laubach and John Miller were the team captains.

Despite their overall losing record, Lehigh finished the year at .500 in conference play. The Engineers' 2–2 record against MAC University Division foes tied Lafayette and Temple for third place in the eight-team circuit. They went 1–1 against Middle Three rivals, beating Lafayette but losing to Rutgers.

Lehigh played its home games at Taylor Stadium on the university campus in Bethlehem, Pennsylvania.

Schedule

References

Lehigh
Lehigh
Lehigh Mountain Hawks football seasons
Lehigh Engineers football